Pseudurorchis is a genus of trematodes in the family Opecoelidae.

Species
Pseudurorchis aphanii (Paperna, 1964) Yamaguti, 1971
Pseudurorchis catostomi Schell, 1974
Pseudurorchis lacustris (Paperna, 1964) Yamaguti, 1971

References

Opecoelidae
Plagiorchiida genera